Tripsis is the sixth and final full-length studio album by the Australian progressive metal band Alchemist. Recorded in 2007, Adam Agius stated that the songwriting focused on a consistently heavy approach. A promotional music video for the song "Wrapped in Guilt" was planned. A music video for "Tongues and Knives" premiered on 8 October 2008.

When asked on the meaning of the album, Agius remarked:

Track listing
 "Wrapped in Guilt" − 4:34
 "Tongues and Knives" − 5:15
 "Nothing in No Time" − 5:50
 "Anticipation of a High" − 4:34
 "Grasp the Air" − 4:36
 "CommunicHate" − 4:26
 "Substance for Shadow" − 4:50
 "God Shaped Hole" − 5:05
 "Degenerative Breeding" − 3:47

Credits
 Adam Agius − vocals, guitar, keyboards
 Roy Torkington − guitar, artwork, layout and design
 John Bray − bass guitar
 Rodney Holder − drums, percussion

Release history

References

2007 albums
Alchemist (band) albums
Relapse Records albums